George Harman Durand (February 21, 1838 – June 8, 1903) was a politician, jurist, and attorney from Michigan.

Biography
Durand was born in Cobleskill, New York. He attended the common schools and Genesee Wesleyan Seminary at Lima, New York. Durand moved to Oxford, Michigan, in 1856, where he taught school, studied law, and was admitted to the bar.

Career
Durand commenced practice at Flint, Michigan, in 1858, where he was also a member of the board of education and a member of the board of aldermen, from 1862 to 1867. He was the mayor of Flint in 1873 and 1874.

In 1874, Durand was elected as a Democrat from Michigan's 6th congressional district to the 44th United States Congress, serving from March 4, 1875, to March 3, 1877. In 1876, he lost in the general election to Republican Mark S. Brewer.

Durand resumed his law practice. In 1892, he was one of Michigan's Presidential Electors. He was appointed Justice of the Michigan Supreme Court in 1892, and was subsequently defeated for election to the court in 1893 by Frank A. Hooker. Durand was president of the State board of law examiners for many years and was appointed special assistant United States attorney in Chinese and opium smuggling cases in Oregon, serving from 1893 to 1896.

Death and legacy
Durand died in Flint and is interred in Glenwood Cemetery there.

In 1876, the community of Durand, Michigan, was named after him.

References

External links

History of Durand, Michigan

1838 births
1903 deaths
1892 United States presidential electors
Mayors of Flint, Michigan
Michigan city council members
Justices of the Michigan Supreme Court
Burials at Glenwood Cemetery (Flint, Michigan)
Democratic Party members of the United States House of Representatives from Michigan
People from Cobleskill, New York
19th-century American politicians
19th-century American judges